Judo was an event at the Island Games, the biennial multi-sports event for island nations, territories and dependencies. Judo first appeared as a sport at the Island Games in 1989

Minimum age - 13

Events
Judo had a twelve year absence from the Island Games then was discontinued after 2009.

Top Medalists

Men's

Men's 1

Men's 2

Men's 3

Men's 4

Men's 5

Men's 6

Men's 7

Men's Open

Men's Team

Women's

Women's 1

Women's 2

Women's 3

Women's 4

Women's 5

Women's 6

Women's 7

Women's Open

Women's Team

Women's Team Pool

References

 
Sports at the Island Games
Island Games